Robert Lefebvre (1907–1989) was a French cinematographer.

Selected filmography
 The Polish Jew (1931)
 His Best Client (1932)
 Tossing Ship (1932)
 Nicole and Her Virtue (1932)
 Le Roi des Champs-Élysées (1934)
 Sapho (1934)
 Paris-Deauville (1934)
 Mademoiselle Mozart (1935)
 Excursion Train (1936)
 The New Men (1936)
 Beethoven's Great Love (1937)
 Southern Mail (1937)
 The Kiss of Fire (1937)
 Ultimatum (1938)
 Ernest the Rebel (1938)
 Beating Heart (1940)
 Premier rendez-vous (1941)
 The Last of the Six (1941)
 Annette and the Blonde Woman (1942)
 Colonel Chabert (1943)
 Voyage Without Hope (1943)
 Goodbye Darling (1946) 
 The White Night (1948)
 To the Eyes of Memory (1948)
 The Dance of Death (1948)
 The Secret of Mayerling (1949)
 The King (1949)
 God Needs Men (1950)
 The Unexpected Voyager (1950)
 Ballerina (1950)
 Lady Paname (1950)
 Edward and Caroline (1951)
 The Cape of Hope (1951)
 Casque d'Or (1952)
 The Call of Destiny (1953)
 One Step to Eternity (1954)
 Ali Baba and the Forty Thieves (1954)
 Bad Liaisons (1955)
 Nathalie (1957)
 And Your Sister? (1958)
 Life Together (1958)
 Nathalie, Secret Agent (1959)
 Ravishing (1960)
 Girl on the Road (1962)
 How to Succeed in Love (1962)
 Relax Darling (1964)
 That Tender Age (1964)

External links
 

1907 births
1989 deaths
Cinematographers from Paris